Joseph Sandars (1821 – 14 March 1893) was a British Conservative politician.

Son of Joseph Sandars and Anna McKenzie Richards. After unsuccessfully contesting Devonport at the 1847 general election, Sandars became Conservative Member of Parliament (MP) for Great Yarmouth at a by-election in 1848—caused by the 1847 general election result being declared void due to bribery. He then held the seat until 1852 when he unsuccessfully sought election as a Peelite at Bewdley.

References

External links
 

UK MPs 1847–1852
Conservative Party (UK) MPs for English constituencies
1821 births
1893 deaths